The Munster Express newspaper was established in 1860 in the South Eastern Irish city of Waterford.

The newspaper covers stories from Waterford city and County Waterford. It retails at €2.00. The Munster Expresss office is located on the Quay in Waterford City.

The paper has four sections - News, Sport, Townlands and Encore. 

In October 2019, it was reported that Iconic Newspapers were in advanced talks to acquire The Munster Express.

Editor
The Munster Express is edited by Kieran Walsh.

Journalists
Kieran Foley
Eoghan Dalton

Columnists
Kieran Walsh 
John O'Connor 
Kieran Foley
Matt Keane

Sports reporters
Catherine Power - Sports Editor 
Matt Keane
Thomas Keane
Brian Flannery

Entertainment
Liam Murphy

Other
Many articles within the paper are not accredited to any specific person. This is especially true of the local notes section, for which notes are submitted by many people from across different areas.

Circulation
The Munster Express covers Waterford City and County; South Kilkenny; Carrick-on-Suir and Clonmel, County Tipperary; and New Ross, County Wexford.

References

External links

Irish Newspaper Archives website Its full archives are available at Irish Newspaper Archives

1860 establishments in Ireland
Mass media in Waterford (city)
Newspapers published in the Republic of Ireland
Newspapers established in 1860